Right Reverend Peter Birch (4 September 1911 – 7 March 1981) was the Roman Catholic Bishop of Ossory from 1964 until his death in 1981.

He was known for his activism on behalf of social and community services. He served as a guide and mentor to Sister Stanislaus Kennedy who, in 1974, was appointed by the Irish Government as the first chair of the National Committee on Pilot Schemes to Combat Poverty.

Early life and education
Birch was born in 1911 in Tullowglass, Jenkinstown, County Kilkenny to a farming family, the eldest of seven children. He began his education in Clinstown National School in 1916, and later was educated at St Kieran's College, Kilkenny and St Patrick's College, Maynooth, where he was ordained in 1937.

Following ordination he gained a Higher Diploma in Education and in 1938 joined the teaching staff at St Kieran's College. After writing about the history of St Kieran's, he received an Master of Arts in English before earning a doctorate, and was later appointed to the staff of St Patrick's College, Maynooth, and as a professor of Education and Lecturer in Catechetics in 1953.

Episcopal ministry
In 1962, Birch was appointed as the Coadjutor Bishop of Ossory, Ireland. In 1964, he became Bishop of Ossory, instrumental in the establishment of the Diocesan Social Services.

Death
Birch died on 7 March 1981, aged 69, and was succeeded as bishop by Laurence Forristal.

References

External links
 Publication by Dr Birch, Bishop of Ossory, amazon.com; accessed 7 February 2015.
 Profile, mayonews.ie; accessed 7 February 2015.
 Reference to Dr Birch's activism, srstan.ie; accessed 7 February 2015.

Roman Catholic bishops of Ossory
Alumni of St Patrick's College, Maynooth
People from County Kilkenny
1911 births
1981 deaths
20th-century Roman Catholic bishops in Ireland